Danil is a Central Asian and Russian male given name meaning "The Creator's Gift" in certain dialects of the Turkic languages  and "God is my Judge" in Hebrew. It is as a variant of the Russian name Daniil.

Notable people with the name include:

 Danil Bugakov (born 1988), Uzbek swimmer
 Danil Burkenya (born 1978), Russian track and field athlete
 Danil Domdjoni (born 1985), Croatian karate fighter
 Danil Faizullin (born 1993), Russian ice hockey player
 Danil Haustov (born 1980), Estonian swimmer
 Danil Junaidi (born 1986), Indonesian footballer
 Danil Khalimov (born 1978), Kazakh Greco-Roman wrestler
 Danil Klenkin (born 1990), Russian football player
 Danil Kutuzov (born 1987), Russian futsal player
 Danil Mamayev (born 1994), Russian ice hockey player
 Danil Poluboyarinov (born 1997), Russian football player
 Danil Romantsev (born 1993), Russian ice hockey player
 Danil Yerdakov (born 1989), Russian ice hockey player
 Danil Venho (Born 1970) Finnish recording engineer

Surname
 Konstantin Danil (1798–1873), Serbian painter

See also
 Daniel

References